The Kelly File was an American news television program hosted by journalist and former attorney Megyn Kelly on the Fox News Channel. The program was a spinoff of The O'Reilly Factor, and focused on late-breaking stories in a live format as well as news analysis and in-depth investigative reports interspersed with newsmaker interviews.

Premiering on October 7, 2013, the program aired Monday through Friday live from 9:00 pm to 10:00 pm ET. It was rebroadcast from 12:00 am to 1:00 am ET, however in the event of a breaking news story, the 12:00 am rebroadcast was replaced with an additional live show. A pre-recorded Sunday edition also aired, featuring the top story of the week.

On January 3, 2017, it was announced Kelly would be leaving the network to move over to NBC News. The last airing of The Kelly File was broadcast on January 6, Kelly's last day with Fox News. The show was replaced on Fox News' 9 pm time slot by Tucker Carlson Tonight, which relocated from the 7 pm time slot.

Trish Regan was a frequent guest host of the program in Kelly's absence.

References

External links
 
 The Kelly File at Fox News Insider
 Megyn Kelly's bio on FoxNews.com
 

Fox News original programming
2013 American television series debuts
2010s American television news shows
2017 American television series endings
Current affairs shows
English-language television shows
Megyn Kelly